The 2007–08 LNBP was the 8th season of the Liga Nacional de Baloncesto Profesional, one of the professional basketball leagues of Mexico. The regular season began September 6, 2007 and ended on January 19, 2008. The playoffs ended on March 13, 2008. The league title was won by Halcones UV Xalapa, which defeated Soles de Mexicali in the championship series, 4–3.

Format 
24 teams participate. The teams are divided in two groups of 12 teams each, called Zonas (zones): Zona Norte (North) and Zona Sur (South). The first 8 teams in each group qualify for the playoffs. The group playoffs have quarterfinals (best-of-5), semifinals (best-of-7) and finals (best-of-7). The winner of each group series qualify for the championship series (best-of-7), named Final de Finales (Final of Finals).

Teams

Regular season

Zona Norte standings

Zona Sur standings

Playoffs 
Source

All-Star Game 
The 2007 LNBP All-Star Game was played in Nuevo Laredo on December 10, 2007 at 21:00 and was broadcast by TVC Deportes. The game was played between Zona Norte and Zona Sur, with no distinction between foreign and Mexican players. Zona Norte won, 123–113, in front of an attendance of 1,800 people.

Teams 

Zona Norte
  Ramel Allen (Santos Reales de San Luis)
  Kenya Capers (Unión Zacatecas)
  Leroy Hickerson (Galgos de Tijuana)
  Robert Hornsby (Correcaminos UAT Victoria)
  Horacio Llamas (Soles de Mexicali)
  Richard López (Soles de Mexicali)
  Karim Malpica (Algodoneros de la Comarca)
  Sergio Sánchez (Lobos de la UAdeC)
  Alex Sanders (Venados de Nuevo Laredo)
  Arim Solares (Santos Reales de San Luis)
  Stephen Soriano (Correcaminos UAT Victoria)
  Antoine Stockman (Venados de Nuevo Laredo)
  Larry Taylor (Lobos Grises de la UAD)
 Coaches:  Lewis LaSalle Taylor (Lobos Grises de la UAD) and  Daniel Óscar Frola (Santos Reales de San Luis)

Zona Sur
  Harold Arceneaux (Lechugueros de León)
  Raymundo Castillo (Tecos de la UAG)
  Devon Ford (Panteras de Aguascalientes)
  Alonso Izaguirre (Halcones UV Veracruz)
  Dallas Logan (Halcones UV Córdoba)
  Nakiea Miller (Bucaneros de Campeche)
  Adam Parada (Tecos de la UAG)
  Cedric Patton (Caballeros de Culiacán)
  Galen Robinson (Pioneros de Quintana Roo)
  Hernán Salcedo (Ángeles de Puebla)
  Enrique Zúñiga (Lechugueros de León)
 Coaches:  Ángel González (Halcones UV Córdoba) and  Alberto Espasandín (Tecos de la UAG)

References

External links 
 2008 LNBP season on Latinbasket.com

LNBP seasons
LNBP